"" (The Wine) is a concert aria for soprano and orchestra, composed in 1929 by Alban Berg. The lyrics are from Stefan George's translation of three poems from Charles Baudelaire's , as is the secret text of Berg's Lyric Suite. "Die Seele des Weines" (The Wine's Soul), "Der Wein der Liebenden" (The Wine of Lovers), and "Der Wein des Einsamen" (The Wine of the Lonely One). The aria was dedicated to Ružena Herlinger, its commissioner, and first performed in Königsberg on June 4, 1930, with Hermann Scherchen.

The piece includes a parody of a tango (bars 39, 181) and includes an alto saxophone. The tone row contains a complete ascending D harmonic minor scale and the remaining five notes are ordered so that in the inverted form they arpeggiate a jazzy added sixth chord with blue third (G, F, D, D, B). The central sonority of the work, as characteristic of Berg's later music, comprises triads separated by half an octave: F and B (in German: H) superimposed over a low D. These two letter names, H and F, are presumably a reference to Hanna Fuchs-Robettin, and the title may be a reference to her husband's wine cellar.

The music of the central section of a ternary ABA structure "is a palindrome within itself," with the outer sections being through-composed. Bars 112 to 140 are then heard in retrograde as bars 140 to 170.

Sources

External links

 – Annelies Kupper, Bavarian Radio Symphony Orchestra, conducted by Hermann Scherchen (1957) (Scherchen also conducted the premiere)

Compositions by Alban Berg
Les Fleurs du mal in popular culture
Twelve-tone compositions
1929 compositions
Arias in German
Soprano arias